The 2016 Missouri lieutenant gubernatorial election was held on November 8, 2016, to elect the Lieutenant Governor of Missouri, concurrently with the 2016 U.S. presidential election, as well as elections to the United States Senate and elections to the United States House of Representatives and various state and local elections.

The primaries were held on August 2. Incumbent Republican Lieutenant Governor Peter Kinder did not seek re-election to a fourth term in office, instead unsuccessfully running for Governor of Missouri. State Senator Mike Parson and former U.S. Representative Russ Carnahan won the Republican and Democratic primaries, respectively.

Democratic primary

Candidates

Declared
Winston Apple, musician, author, retired teacher and 2014 State House candidate
Russ Carnahan, former U.S. Representative
Tommie Pierson, state representative

Withdrawn
Brad Bradshaw, physician and attorney

Declined
Barry Aycock, businessman
Jason Holsman, state senator
Mike Sanders, Jackson County Executive, former Jackson County Prosecuting Attorney and former Chairman of the Missouri Democratic Party
John Wright, state representative
Clint Zweifel, State Treasurer of Missouri

Endorsements

Polling

Results

Republican primary

Candidates

Declared
Mike Parson, state senator
Bev Randles, attorney and Chairwoman of Missouri Club for Growth
Arnie C. - AC Dienoff

Withdrawn
Peter Kinder, incumbent Lieutenant Governor (running for Governor)

Declined
Tom Dempsey, President Pro Tem of the Missouri Senate
Tim Jones, Speaker of the Missouri House of Representatives
Mike Kehoe, state senator
Doug Libla, state senator
Eric Schmitt, state senator (running for state treasurer)
Caleb Jones, state representative

Endorsements

Polling

Results

Green Party

Candidates

Declared
Jennifer Leach, labor union activist

General election

Polling

with Brad Bradshaw

Results

See also
 2016 Missouri gubernatorial election

References

External links
Official campaign websites
Russ Carnahan for Lieutenant Governor (D)
Mike Parson for Lieutenant Governor (R)

Lieutenant Governor
Missouri
2016